John Watson (28 November 1883 – 6 May 1946) was a Scottish professional footballer who made over 160 appearances as a full back in the Southern League for Brentford. He also played in the Football League for Newcastle United and Leeds City.

Playing career 
A full back, Watson began his career in his native Scotland at Scottish League Division Two club Clyde. He earned a £200 move to English First Division club Newcastle United in October 1902. Watson managed only three league appearances before joining Southern League First Division club New Brompton. Watson joined fellow Southern League First Division club Brentford in 1903 and made 168 appearances in a five-year spell with the club.

Along with Brentford teammates Jock Hamilton, Tom McAllister and Adam Bowman, Watson returned to the Football League to join Second Division club Leeds City in May 1908. He immediately became a fixture in the first team, being named captain, forming a full back-partnership with Jack White and making 32 appearances during the 1908–09 season. Watson began the 1909–10 season as an ever-present, but lost his place in the team and departed the club in 1910. Watson made 49 appearances for Leeds City and ended his career with a second spell at Clyde.

Representative career 
While in his first spell with Clyde, Watson appeared for a Glasgow Select XI against Sheffield.

Personal life 
After his retirement from football, Watson returned to Brentford and was the landlord of the New Inn (one of four pubs situated at the corners of Griffin Park) from July 1910 until his death in May 1946. Watson's son (also nicknamed "Jock") became a footballer and played for Ealing, Windsor and Slough in the 1930s and captained the latter club.

Career statistics

References

1883 births
1946 deaths
People from Newarthill
Footballers from North Lanarkshire
Scottish footballers
Association football fullbacks
Brentford F.C. players
English Football League players
Scottish Football League players
Clyde F.C. players
Newcastle United F.C. players
Gillingham F.C. players
Leeds City F.C. players
Southern Football League players